The Buzz may refer to:
The Buzz (Marvel Comics), a fictional character in the Marvel Comics' series Spider-Girl
The Buzz (talk show), a television entertainment news and talk show in the Philippines (known as Buzz ng Bayan since 2013, but later was reverted to its original name in the 2nd quarter of 2014)
KRBZ, a Kansas City radio station known as "The Buzz"
KTBZ-FM, a Houston radio station known as "The Buzz"
WBUZ-FM, a Nashville, Tennessee radio station also known as "The Buzz"
WSBU-FM, a college radio station at St. Bonaventure, NY known as "The Buzz"
WBTZ, an FM alternative rock radio station broadcasting from Plattsburgh, NY known as "99.9 The Buzz"
WIRK, an FM radio station in West Palm Beach, FL formerly known as "The Buzz"
The Buzz (Australian radio show)
The Buzz, a Boston Bruins Top 10 countdown on New England Sports Network
A London band backing David Bowie on the 1966 singles "Do Anything You Say" and "I Dig Everything"
The Buzz (film), a 1992 film directed by Hart Bochner
"The Buzz", a 2014 song by New World Sound.
Peter Bosustow (born 1957), Australian rules footballer known as "The Buzz"
Da Buzz, Swedish band
Buzz (TV series), often known as The Buzz, Canadian TV series

See also

 
 Buzz (disambiguation)